VTB Capital is a Russian investment bank. It is one of the three strategic business arms of VTB Group, along with the corporate and retail businesses.

VTB Capital has been ranked among the top investment banks in Russia, the CIS and Central and Eastern Europe regions according to industry league tables, including Bloomberg, Thomson Reuters and Dealogic.

History
Created in 2008, the business is headquartered in Moscow with offices in London, Singapore, Dubai, Hong Kong, New York City, Vienna, Sofia and Kyiv. To establish VTB Capital, numerous bankers from Deutsche Bank's Moscow office were hired.

In 2015 VTB Capital ranked first in Dealogic's FY 2015 league tables in the Debt and Equity capital markets bookrunners and M&A Advisor categories across Russia and the CIS. In the same year VTB Capital maintained the top position in Dealogic's ranking on the volume of transactions in the Russian domestic debt capital market. The company arranged 70 transactions for a total of US $5.447 billion with 25 per cent market share. VTB Capital also ranked first in ECM in Russia and the CIS, having arranged eight transactions, amounting to US $720 million and taking a record 40.8 per cent share of the market.  In M&A, VTB Capital was one of the top two leaders in Central and Eastern Europe. The bank also advised on a total of 15 transactions, equivalent to a volume of US $11.33 billion with a Russian market share of 23 per cent.

Management
VTB Capital is led by Alexei Yakovitsky, CEO and Chairman of VTB Capital holding companies Board of Directors.

Activities
Since 2009 VTB Capital has run an annual international investment forum, Russia Calling!, in both London and Moscow. Each month, VTB publishes a Russian Economy Monthly report.

Subsidiaries 

In 2018 in response to sanctions imposed by western countries on a range of state-linked Russian companies a New-York based subsidiary of VTB Capital in the US was reportedly sold to its management and was renamed into Xtellus Capital Partners in order to continue their work. Following the deal VTB said that there would be no direct VTB Bank presence in the US.

Corporate affairs

Litigation 
VTB claimed that Nutritek was fraudulently misrepresenting the value of dairy companies it was selling to another company, Russagroprom LLC. The 2013 decision contributed to the United Kingdom's Supreme Court substantially restating the English company law position in relation to piercing of the corporate veil.

References

External links

"VTB Bank"
"VTB Capital"
"Russia Calling!"

Banks established in 2008
Russian investment banks
Companies based in Moscow